Red on Blonde is a 1996 album of Bob Dylan covers by contemporary folk/bluegrass musician Tim O'Brien.  The title is a reference to Dylan's 1966 album, Blonde on Blonde and Tim's alter-ego during his Hot Rize days- Red Knuckles, leader of the Western Swing outfit, Red Knuckles and the Trailblazers.

Track listing 
All songs written by Bob Dylan
 "Senor (Tales of Yankee Power)" - 3:59 
 "Tombstone Blues" - 3:41 
 "Farewell, Angelina" - 4:17 
 "The Wicked Messenger" - 2:25 
 "Father of Night" - 2:37 
 "Subterranean Homesick Blues" - 2:41 
 "Everything Is Broken" - 2:49 
 "Man Gave Names to All the Animals" - 4:24 
 "Masters of War" - 3:22 
 "Oxford Town" - 1:52 
 "Maggie's Farm" - 3:20 
 "Forever Young" - 2:29 
 "Lay Down Your Weary Tune" - 3:28

Personnel

Musicians
Tim O'Brien - Bouzouki, Fiddle, Mandolin, Vocals
Steve Cohn - Accordion 
Charlie Cushman - Banjo 
Jerry Douglas - Guitar, Hawaiian Guitar, Lap Steel Guitar, Guitar (Resonator) 
Mark Graham - Harmonica 
Celeste Krenz - Vocals 
Kathy Mattea - Vocals 
Scott Nygaard - Guitar 
Mollie O'Brien - Vocals 
Mark Schatz - Banjo, Bass, Vocals 
Bob Tyler - Vocals 
Glen Zankey - Vocals

Production
Tim O'Brien - Producer
Randy Best - Engineer 
Kevin Clock - Mixing 
David Glasser Mastering

Other
Willie Matthews & Charles Sawtelle- Liner Notes 
Senor McGuire - Photography 
Sue Meyer - Design

See also
List of songs written by Bob Dylan
List of artists who have covered Bob Dylan songs

Notes and sources

External links 
Red on Blonde page at timobrien.net

1996 albums
Bob Dylan tribute albums
Tim O'Brien (musician) albums
Sugar Hill Records albums